Kayabağlar is a belde in the Kurtalan District of Siirt Province in Turkey. The settlement had a population of 5,179 in 2021.

References 

Kurdish settlements in Siirt Province

Populated places in Siirt Province